Oliver Boot (born 1979) is an English actor. He trained at RADA, and has appeared on both stage and screen. His theatre credits include Antony and Cleopatra, In Extremis (in the role of Abelard), Three Musketeers, Hayfever, Tartuffe, Jamaica Inn and an award-winning world tour of Othello with Cheek by Jowl. He has starred as Demetrius in Shakespeare's A Midsummer Night's Dream and as Ventidius in Timon of Athens, at the Globe, in London. 

In 2006 he was asked to perform Henry V for Elizabeth II and Prince Philip at a private dinner party thrown by the American embassy.  He has also acted in the popular TV series Two Pints of Lager and a Packet of Crisps, As If, The Time of Your Life, Hotel Babylon, Distant Shores, Holby City, Garrow's Law and My Family.

His film credits include Blooded an independent British film about the hunting ban in the '90s and more recently he played opposite Mark Strong and Dominic West in the Disney film John Carter.

Filmography

Film

Television

References

External links

1979 births
Living people
Alumni of RADA
English male stage actors
English male television actors